Deer Lake is a town in the western part of the island of Newfoundland in the province of Newfoundland and Labrador, Canada.

The town derives its name from Deer Lake and is situated at the outlet of the upper Humber River at the northeastern end of the lake.

History
The first settlers in the area arrived from Cape Breton Island, Nova Scotia in 1864. Originally loggers and trappers, the settlers later took up farming.

In 1922, a work camp was set up to support the International Pulp and Paper company. The camp would later become the town of Deer Lake. A formal townsite was constructed in 1925 and included a railway terminal, churches and a small hospital. The town was incorporated in 1950 with Phil Hodder as its first mayor.

The airport was built in 1955 and is one of the town's major employers. In 2004, Deer Lake Regional Airport redesigned the airport terminal, which was completed in June 2007. The primary population that the airport serves is approximately 55,000. The airport serves people from Rocky Harbour to Corner Brook, as well as around Deer Lake.

Name
The town was named by early settlers of the area. Caribou could be seen crossing the lake in huge quantities. The first Europeans who came to this area, having never before seen caribou called them 'deer'. However, 'deer' in older times could simply mean animal. The town was then named accordingly.

Economy
The town is located in Division No. 5 and is the gateway to the Great Northern Peninsula, owing to an important highway interchange on the Trans-Canada Highway.  It is the closest major community to Gros Morne National Park and is home to the Deer Lake Regional Airport.

A hydroelectric plant was established on the Humber River in 1925 to provide electricity to a pulp and paper paper mill in Corner Brook.

Sights and tourism
Deer Lake offers accommodation for tourists as well as restaurants, supermarkets, convenience stores and gas stations. There is a stadium, swimming pool and a bowling alley in the Hodder Memorial Recreational Complex. St. Paul's United Church, a wooden church dating from 1955 and the modern Salvation Army building are worth a visit. The Main Street offers a scenic view of the lake.

Demographics 

Climate
Deer Lake has a humid continental climate (Dfb) with moderately warm summers that are on the short side, with quite long and cold winters that are moderated by its proximity to a large body of water. With precipitation high year-round, Deer Lake receives plenty of snowfall in winters.

Transport
The community is served by Deer Lake Regional Airport, which is the nearest airport to Corner Brook. It is also the busiest airport in the western part of the island. It also serves an area stretching from Port Aux Basques on the southern tip, the Northern Peninsula and eastward towards the island's centre. As such, it serves a population of approximately 100,000 people.

Notable people
 Dwight Ball, former Premier of Newfoundland and Labrador
 Darren Langdon, National Hockey League player

Gallery

See also
 List of cities and towns in Newfoundland and Labrador

References

External links

Official web site
Deer Lake – Encyclopedia of Newfoundland and Ladrador, vol. 1, pp. 608–609.

Towns in Newfoundland and Labrador